The gens Apronia was a plebeian family at ancient Rome throughout the history of the Republic and into imperial times.  The first member of the gens to achieve prominence was Gaius Apronius, tribune of the plebs in 449 BC.  None of the Apronii obtained the consulship until the first century AD.

Praenomina
The Apronii are known to have used the praenomina Gaius, Quintus, and Lucius.

Branches and cognomina
The only cognomen associated with the Apronii is Caesianus, which is probably derived from the nomen of the gens Caesia, and may indicate descent from the Caesii through the female line.

Members

 Gaius Apronius, elected one of the tribunes of the plebs on the abolition of the decemvirate in 449 BC.
 Quintus Apronius, the chief of the decumani in Sicily during the government of Verres (73-71 BC), was the target of Cicero's vituperation for his rapacity, sexual perversions, and varieties of wickedness.
 Lucius Apronius, consul suffectus in AD 8, and subsequently proconsul in Africa and propraetor in Germania Inferior, where he was unsuccessful in quelling in a revolt of the Frisii.
 Apronia L. f., murdered by her husband, Marcus Plautius Silvanus, praetor in AD 24.
 Apronia L. f., wife of Gnaeus Cornelius Lentulus Gaetulicus, consul in AD 26.
 Lucius Apronius L. f. Caesianus, consul in AD 39.

See also
 List of Roman gentes

References

Roman gentes